Lambton East was a federal electoral district represented in the House of Commons of Canada from 1882 to 1935. It was located in the province of Ontario. This riding was created from Lambton riding.

The East Riding of the county of Lambton was initially defined to consist of the townships of Enniskillen, Brooke, Warwick and Bosanquet, the town of Petrolia, and the villages of Oil Springs, Alvinston, Watford, Arkona and Thedford.

In 1903, it was expanded to include the township of Euphemia and the town of Forest. In 1914, it was expanded to include the townships of Zone and Camden in the county of Kent.

In 1924, it was defined as consisting of the townships of Bosanquet, Warwick, Inniskillen, Brooke, Dawn and Euphemia in the County of Lambton, and the townships of Zone and Camden in the County of Kent.

The electoral district was abolished in 1933 when it was redistributed between Lambton West and Lambton—Kent ridings.

Election results

|}

|}

|}

|}

On Mr. Simmons' death, 11 November 1903:

|}

|}

|}

|}

|}

|}

|}

|}

|}

See also 

 List of Canadian federal electoral districts
 Past Canadian electoral districts

External links 
Riding history from the Library of Parliament

Former federal electoral districts of Ontario